Seton High School is a parochial all-female, college-preparatory high school in the Price Hill neighborhood of Cincinnati, Ohio, USA.

History
Seton was founded as Mount St. Vincent Academy in 1854. It was also known as Cedar Grove. With the arrival of Elder High School's girls' department, Cedar Grove was renamed in honor of Elizabeth Ann Seton on September 12, 1927.

Academics
Seton High school serves girls from 9th to 12th grade.

Athletics

As a member of the Girls' Greater Catholic League, Seton teams have won numerous league, district, regional and state championships in 12 varsity sports:

Fall
 Cross Country
 Golf
 Soccer
 Tennis
 Volleyball

Winter
 Basketball
 Bowling
 Swimming & Diving

Spring
 Lacrosse
 Softball
 Track & Field

Ohio High School Athletic Association State Championships

 Girls Volleyball – 1984, 1985, 1986, 1988, 1996, 2005 
 Girls Soccer – 2022

Notes and references

External links
 School Website

High schools in Hamilton County, Ohio
Private schools in Cincinnati
Catholic secondary schools in Ohio
Girls' schools in Ohio
Educational institutions established in 1854
Roman Catholic Archdiocese of Cincinnati
1854 establishments in Ohio